Rann may refer to:

Places
Rann (fictional planet), a fictional planet in the Polaris star system of the DC Comics Universe
Rann of Kutch, Gujarat, India
Great Rann of Kutch, a seasonally marshy region located in the Thar Desert
Little Rann of Kutch, a salt marsh
Rann, German name of the town of Brežice, southeastern Slovenia
 Brežice Castle, in the town
Rann, Borno, a town in Borno State, Nigeria

Other uses
Rann (film) (raṇa "battle"), a 2010 Hindi-language film starring Amitabh Bachchan
Rann (magazine) was an Ulster poetry journal which ran between 1948 and 1953.

People with the surname
John Rann (1750–1774), English criminal and highwayman
Chris Rann (born 1946), Australian publicist and media strategist
Mike Rann (born 1953), Australian politician
Thomas Rann (born 1981), Australian cellist
Tyler Rann (21st century), American guitarist
Charles Rann Kennedy (1808–1867), English lawyer and classicist

See also
Ran (disambiguation)
Rann-Thanagar War, a comic book series